Tatyana Alekseyevna Zhuk (January 1, 1946 - March 21, 2011) was a Soviet/Russian pair skater. With partner Aleksandr Gorelik, she was the 1968 Winter Olympics silver medalist. They were also the 1965 World bronze medalists and the 1966 and 1968 World silver medalists, as well as the 1965 European bronze and 1966 silver medalists.

Zhuk previously competed with Aleksandr Gavrilov, with whom she medaled at the 1963 and 1964 European Championships and the 1963 World Championships. They placed 5th at the 1964 Winter Olympics.

In 1969, Zhuk became pregnant. She and her husband Albert Shesternyov decided to keep the baby and retire from competitive skating.

Results

Ladies' singles

Pairs with Gavrilov

Pairs with Gorelik

References

External links
 Database Olympics
 Pairs on Ice: Zhuk & Gorelik
 Pairs on Ice: Zhuk & Gavrilov
 Skatabase: 1960s Worlds
 Skatabase: 1960s Europeans

1946 births
2011 deaths
Figure skaters from Saint Petersburg
Soviet female pair skaters
Russian female pair skaters
Figure skaters at the 1968 Winter Olympics
Figure skaters at the 1964 Winter Olympics
Olympic figure skaters of the Soviet Union
Olympic silver medalists for the Soviet Union
Olympic medalists in figure skating
World Figure Skating Championships medalists
European Figure Skating Championships medalists
Medalists at the 1968 Winter Olympics